Dinesh Kumar Mani (born January 10, 1953) is a philanthropist and medical researcher and practitioner in the field of alternative medicine, known for his contributions in the treatment of cancer. He and Sant Prasad founded the first bonded laboratory in Bihar to do research in alternative medicines.  He is also the founder and director of the Rural Health Organization, which works to improve health conditions of people living in the countryside and organizes camps for free treatment of patients.  He is the author of many books on cancer and healthy lifestyles. He was one of the medical advisers to V. P. Singh during the year 1994, while the former Prime Minister was suffering from blood cancer.

Early life
He was born in Arrah district of Bihar. His father, the late Dr. Sant Prasad, was a renowned philanthropist, educationist and medical practitioner. His father fought with the India’s freedom movement with Dr. Rajendra Prasad and Pandit Jawahar Lal Nehru. His father was the first person from Bihar to travel to the United States and other countries to train, learning about rural and social welfare programmes.

At the age of 13, he received the first prize at a national level science fair organized by All India Science Teachers' Association. After completion of college education, he joined Jayaprakash Narayan's movement of education reformation.  He worked with George Fernandes, Nitish Kumar, Sushil Kumar Modi, Ravi Shankar Prasad, Raghuvansh Prasad Singh, Raghupati in movement and got chance to learn from stalwarts such as Acharya Kriplani, Dada Dharmadhikari and Narayan Bhai Desai.

Philosophy of treatment
His philosophy of treatment is influenced by the ideologies of Charaka, the father of Indian Medicine, Samuel Hahnemann, the founder of Homoeopathy, Vandergrowell’s Cell Therapy and the findings of frontier researchers working on cell and molecular biology.

Contributions

Kala-azar
He worked through camps organized by Rural Health Organization in collaboration with German Organization, Indo German Service Society from 1992 to 1994 and treated the patients, including those with pentamidine-resistant pathogens, with non-toxic herbal medicine researched by him for kala-azar which was prevailing as epidemic in most part of the Bihar, especially in block Andhrathadi of Madhubani district and Sakra block of Muzaffarpur district. For this contribution on kala-azar, he got admiration from Voluntary Health Association of India and World Health Organization.

Cancer
He is researching non-toxic, low-cost cancer medicines.

HIV/AIDS
He organized awareness programmes through Rural Health Organization for street children suffering from HIV/AIDS during 1997-98. He also wrote a book “Children with AIDS” which was published in many languages.  He also received a letter of appreciation from Indian Council of Medical Research for his contributions in the field of HIV/AIDS. The UNAIDS also chose “Children with AIDS” as its theme of the year in 1998.

References

Further reading

External links
 

People from Bihar
1953 births
Living people
Alternative cancer treatment advocates
Alternative medicine researchers
Indian medical researchers